67 (sixty-seven) is the natural number following 66 and preceding 68. It is an odd number.

In mathematics
67 is:

the 19th prime number (the next is 71).
 a Chen prime.
an irregular prime.
a lucky prime.
the sum of five consecutive primes (7 + 11 + 13 + 17 + 19).
a Heegner number.
a Pillai prime since 18! + 1 is divisible by 67, but 67 is not one more than a multiple of 18.
palindromic in quinary (2325) and senary (1516).
a super-prime. (19 is prime)
an isolated prime. (65 and 69 are not prime)

In science
The atomic number of holmium, a lanthanide.

Astronomy
Messier object M67, a magnitude 7.5 open cluster in the constellation Cancer.
The New General Catalogue object NGC 67, an elliptical galaxy in the constellation Andromeda.

In music

 "Car 67", a song by the band Driver 67
 Chicago's song "Questions 67 and 68"
 Elton John's song "Old '67" on The Captain & The Kid CD, (2006)
 British rap group called 67
 Rapper Drake released the song named "Star67" off his album If You're Reading This It's Too Late

In other fields

Sixty-seven is:
The registry of the U.S. Navy's aircraft carrier , named after U.S. President John F. Kennedy.
The number of the French department Bas-Rhin.
The number of counties in Alabama, Florida, and Pennsylvania.
The province/traffic code of Zonguldak Province in Turkey.
In the U.S., *67 is a common prefix-code for blocking caller ID info on the subsequent call.

In sports

 Buddy Arrington's best-known NASCAR car number.
 The Ottawa 67's, founded in 1967.
 Pekka Koskela skated the 1000 metres in 1:07:00 (67 seconds) on 10 November 2007, a world record at the time.
 The number of the laps of the German Grand Prix since 2002 if the race was held at Hockenheimring.

External links

References 

Integers